The International Encyclopedia of Sexuality is a four-volume reference work on human sexuality, organized by country. It is also available online.  It was published between 1997 and 2001 and was edited by Robert T. Francoeur and Raymond J. Noonan with contributions from academics worldwide including Ramsey Elkholy. An updated one-volume version was published in 2004 under the title The Continuum Complete International Encyclopedia of Sexuality and was hosted on The Kinsey Institute's website.

References

External links 
 IES online
 The Continuum Complete Encyclopedia of Sexuality at The Kinsey Institute.

1997 non-fiction books
Encyclopedias of sexuality
English-language encyclopedias